Roberto Soffici (born 29 October 1946) is an Italian pop singer-songwriter, composer and lyricist.

Background 
Born in Pula, the son of composer and conductor Piero, Soffici enrolled at the Giuseppe Verdi Conservatory in Milan, graduating in clarinet, harmony and composition. In the 1970s he started a productive career as a composer, signing songs for Mina, Equipe 84, Nomadi and Ornella Vanoni, among others. From the second half of seventies he is also active as a singer-songwriter; his main success is the 1980 song "Io ti voglio tanto bene", which peaked at sixth place at the Italian hit parade.

References

External links 

Roberto Soffici at Discogs

1946 births
Italian male singers
Italian pop singers
Living people
People from Pula
Italian songwriters
Male songwriters
Italian singer-songwriters
Italian composers
Italian male composers
Milan Conservatory alumni